Mislav Leko (born 19 December 1987) is a Croatian retired football defender.

References

External links
 

1987 births
Living people
Sportspeople from Osijek
Association football defenders
Croatian footballers
NK Olimpija Osijek players
NK Junak Sinj players
NK Hrvatski Dragovoljac players
NK Karlovac players
NK Osijek players
FC Brașov (1936) players
Fredrikstad FK players
Croatian Football League players
First Football League (Croatia) players
Liga I players
Norwegian First Division players
Norwegian Second Division players
Croatian expatriate footballers
Expatriate footballers in Romania
Croatian expatriate sportspeople in Romania
Expatriate footballers in Norway
Croatian expatriate sportspeople in Norway